The decollate snail, scientific name Rumina decollata, is a medium-sized predatory land snail, a species of terrestrial pulmonate gastropod mollusk in the family Achatinidae. It is a European species that has been introduced in a number of areas worldwide.

Taxa inquirenda
 Rumina decollata var. dentata Pallary, 1922
 Rumina decollata var. fusca Pallary, 1899
 Rumina decollata var. striatula Pallary, 1920

Distribution
This species is native to the Mediterranean excluding south-east Mediterranean.

It is introduced in Israel and in Egypt<ref>Commonwealth of Australia. 2002 (April) [http://www.daff.gov.au/__data/assets/pdf_file/0015/24702/fin_egyptian_citrus.pdf Citrus Imports from the Arab Republic of Egypt. A Review Under Existing Import Conditions for Citrus from Israel] . Agriculture, Fisheries and Forestry, Australia. Caption: Gastropods, page 12 and Appendix 2.</ref> since Roman times. It has been introduced into North America, including Phoenix and Glendale, Arizona, and other areas Fresno, California as a biological control agent, in hopes of controlling populations of the brown garden snail.

It is found in Great Britain, as a "hothouse alien"

Shell description
The shell of the decollate snail is long and roughly cone-shaped. It grows to approximately 40mm-45mm in length and a width of 14 mm, and upon reaching mature size, grinds or chips off the end of its own shell by moving its body roughly against hard surfaces, so that the shell takes on a decollate shape, tapering to a blunt end.

Life habits

Sexual maturity occurs at approximately 10 months. An adult is capable of laying 500 eggs in its   lifetime. The eggs are deposited singly in the soil and hatch within 10-45 days.Rumina decollata is a voracious predator, and will readily feed upon common garden snails and slugs and their eggs. The snail eats plant matter as well, but this generalist predator is indiscriminate in its feeding and has been implicated in the decimation of native gastropods (including non-pest species) and beneficial annelids.

Decollate snails are tolerant of dry and cold conditions, during which they burrow deep into the soil. They are most active during the night and during rainfall.

 References 

 Herbert, D.G. (2010). The introduced terrestrial Mollusca of South Africa. SANBI Biodiversity Series, 15: vi + 108 pp. Pretoria.

External links

 Rumina decollata on the UF / IFAS  — Featured Creatures website''.
 A photo of decollates feeding on Helix (ivy)
 Crosse H. (1873). Diagnoses molluscorum novorum. Journal de Conchyliologie. 21(2): 136-144.
 Coquand H. (1862). Géologie et Paléontologie de la région sud de la Provence de Constantine. Mémoires de la Société d'Emulation de la Provence. 2: 5-342.
  Bieler, R. & Slapcinsky, J. (2000). A case study for the development of an island fauna: Recent terrestrial mollusks of Bermuda. Nemouria. 44: 1-99.
 Sparacio, I., Surdo, S., Viviano, R., Liberto, F. & Reitano, A. (2021). Land molluscs from the Isola delle Femmine Nature Reserve (north-western Sicily, Italy) (Gastropoda Architaenioglossa Pulmonata). Biodiversity Journal. 12 (3): 589–624
  ohnson, C. W. (1900). Some notes on Rumina decollata Linn. The Nautilus. 13(10): 117.
 Smith, H. H. (1912). Rumina decollata in Mobile and New Orleans. The Nautilus. 26(1): 4-6
 Ferriss, J. H. (1914). Rumina decollata in Texas. The Nautilus. 28(1): 11

Achatinidae
Biota of the Mediterranean Sea
Biological pest control agents
Gastropods described in 1758
Taxa named by Carl Linnaeus